Daniela is a 1976 Venezuelan telenovela television series written by Enrique Jarnés and produced by Venevisión. Adita Riera and Eduardo Serrano starred as the main protagonists.

Plot
After the death of her father and after having lost everything, Daniela and her mother Eugenia move to a small fishing village in search of a better life. But since they don't have enough money, they end up on the streets. On the other hand, Gustavo Sandoval is a rich millionaire playboy living on his yacht and he has never had any serious relationship. Perla, a beautiful and ambitious girl in the town, decides to conquer him. One day, while walking through the town, Daniela reaches the stall of Ana Maria who sells fried fish. Hungry and without any money, Daniela steals the fish but is discovered by the owner's son, Reuben. Daniela runs and hides inside Gustavo's yacht. Later, her mother falls ill and she takes her to the hospital where they meet Dr. Cruz Dolores who offers to help them. Although Daniela says she won't accept charity, she begins working as a maid at the house of Gustavo.

Cast
Adita Riera as Daniela
Eduardo Serrano as Gustavo
Olga Castillo as Eugenia
Herminia Martínez as Perla
Amelia Roman as Ana Maria
Martin Lantigua as Jose Vicente
Chelo Rodríguez as Veronica
Orlando Urdaneta as Ruben
Zoe Ducos as Cruz Dolores

See also 
List of telenovelas of Venevisión

References

External links

1976 telenovelas
Spanish-language telenovelas
Venezuelan telenovelas
Venevisión telenovelas
1976 Venezuelan television series debuts
1976 Venezuelan television series endings
Television shows set in Caracas